Somatina figurata is a moth of the  family Geometridae. It is found on Madagascar and in Kenya, South Africa and Uganda.

Subspecies
Somatina figurata figurata (Kenya, South Africa)
Somatina figurata candida Prout, 1932 (Madagascar)
Somatina figurata transfigurata Prout, 1922 (Uganda)

References

Moths described in 1897
Scopulini
Moths of Africa
Moths of Madagascar